The 1976 World Figure Skating Championships were held at the Scandinavium in Göteborg, Sweden from 2 to 7 March. At the event, sanctioned by the International Skating Union, medals were awarded in men's singles, ladies' singles, pair skating, and ice dancing.

The ISU Representative was John R. Shoemaker of the United States and the ISU Technical Delegate was Josef Dědič of Czechoslovakia.

Medal tables

Medalists

Medals by country

Results

Men

Referee:
 Sonia Bianchetti 

Assistant Referee:
 Benjamin Wright 

Judges:
 Pamela Peat 
 Charles U. Foster 
 Sergei Kononykhin 
 Elof Niklasson 
 Joan Maclagan 
 Monique Georgelin 
 Kinuko Ueno 
 Walburga Grimm 
 Tadeusz Malinowski 

Substitute judge:
 Inkeri Soininen

Ladies

Referee:
 Elemér Terták 

Assistant Referee:
 Oskar Madl 

Judges:
 Irina Absaliamova 
 Oskar Urban 
 Erika Schiechtl 
 Toshio Suzuki 
 Yvonne S. McGowan 
 David Dore 
 Paul Engelfriet 
 Helga von Wiecki 
 Pamela Daveis 

Substitute judge:
 Berit Aarnes

Pairs

Referee:
 Donald H. Gilchrist 

Assistant Referee:
 Hans Kutschera 

Judges:
 Ardelle K. Sanderson 
 Giordano Abbondati 
 Oskar Urban 
 Walburga Grimm 
 Willi Wernz 
 Sydney R. Croll 
 Valentin Piseev 
 Dorothy MacLeod 
 Norbert Cerny 

Substitute judge:
 Markus Germann

Ice dancing

Referee:
 Lawrence Demmy 

Assistant Referee:
 George J. Blundun 

Judges:
 Maria Zuchowicz 
 Robert Hudson 
 Willi Wernz 
 Elaine DeMore 
 Edwin Kucharz 
 Giovanni Bozetti 
 Irina Absliamova 
 Klára Kozári 
 Dagmar Řeháková 

Substitute judge:
 Joyce Hisey

Sources
 Result list provided by the ISU

World Figure Skating Championships
World Figure Skating Championships
World Figure Skating Championships
World Figure Skating Championships
International figure skating competitions hosted by Sweden
International sports competitions in Gothenburg
March 1976 sports events in Europe
1970s in Gothenburg